Bernard Wilfred Budd QC (18 December 1912 – 5 August 2003), was a British barrister and Liberal Party politician.

Background
Budd was the son of the Reverend W.R.A. Budd. He was educated at Cardiff High School, West Leeds High School and Pembroke College, Cambridge where he was a scholar in natural sciences receiving a BA in 1934 and returning for an MA in 1944. In 1944 he married Margaret Alison Burgin MBE. She was a daughter of Rt Hon. Edward Leslie Burgin a Liberal MP who held office in the National Government of the 1930s. They had two sons, one of which was Sir Colin Richard Budd who became Ambassador to the Netherlands.

Professional career
Budd Served in the Indian Civil Service from 1935 to 1951. He was Called to Bar by Gray's Inn in 1952. In 1969 he was appointed a QC.

Political career
Budd was Liberal candidate for the Dover division in Kent at the 1964 and 1966 general elections, both times placing third. He became a member of the Liberal party law reform panel. He was Liberal candidate for Folkestone and Hythe, also in Kent, at the February and October 1974 general elections, both times placing second. In 1978, he became Chairman of the Association of Liberal Lawyers. He stood as Liberal candidate for Folkestone and Hythe for the final time in his life in the 1979 general election, wherein again he achieved a second-place finish.

Electoral performance

References

External links
 The Times Obituary

1912 births
2003 deaths
Liberal Party (UK) parliamentary candidates
People educated at Cardiff High School
Alumni of Pembroke College, Cambridge
Members of Gray's Inn